Eladio Acosta Arteaga (9 April 1916 – 30 January 2012) was a Colombian Prelate of Roman Catholic Church.

Arteaga was born in La América, Colombia in 1916 and was ordained a priest on 7 August 1949 from the religious order of Congregation of Jesus and Mary. Arteaga was appointed bishop of the Archdiocese of Santa Fe de Antioquia on 6 March 1970 and ordained in April. He would remain at the diocese until his retirement on 10 October 1992. He died in 2012, aged 95

References

External links
Catholic-Hierarchy 

20th-century Roman Catholic bishops in Colombia
1916 births
2012 deaths
Roman Catholic bishops of Santa Fe de Antioquia
Roman Catholic archbishops of Santa Fe de Antioquia
Eudist bishops